Agostino Abbagnale (born 25 August 1966) is an Italian rower and triple Olympic gold medalist. He is the younger brother of multiple Olympic medalists Carmine Abbagnale and Giuseppe Abbagnale.

Biography
Abbagnale was born in Pompei.  He won his first gold medal at the 1988 Summer Olympics in Seoul.  He stroked the Italian Quadruple scull (4x). His brothers Carmine and Giuseppe won gold medals at the same games in the pair with coxswain event (2+).

After the medal ceremony, Abbagnale, who is a poor swimmer, jumped into the rowing lake and landed on one of his partners Davide Tizzano, knocking the gold medal out of his hand.  It took scuba divers two days to recover the missing medal. Shortly thereafter, Abbagnale began suffering from thrombosis which caused blood clots in the veins of his legs. He had to give up rowing for five years, which prevented him from rowing in the 1992 Summer Olympics.

Abbagnale returned to the Olympic stage at the 1996 Summer Olympics, teaming with Davide Tizzano to win the Gold in the double scull (2x). At the 2000 Summer Olympics, Abbagnale repeated his gold medal performance, winning the quadruple scull (4x). A flare-up in his thrombosis forced Abbagnale to retire in 2003.

In 2006, Abbagnale was awarded the Thomas Keller Medal, given by FISA, the governing board for international rowing.  The Thomas Keller Medal is awarded for an outstanding career in international rowing.  Abbagnale's brothers Carmine and Giuseppe had been awarded the Thomas Keller Medal in 1997.

Achievements 
 Olympic Medals: 3 Gold
 World Championship Medals: 2 Gold and 2 Silver.
 Thomas Keller Medal Awarded in 2006 for an outstanding career in international rowing.

Olympic Games 
 2000 – Gold, Quadruple Scull
 1996 – Gold, Double Scull
 1988 – Gold, Quadruple Sculls

World Championships 
 2002 – Silver, Double Scull
 1999 – 7th, Quadruple Scull
 1998 – Gold, Quadruple Scull
 1997 – Gold, Quadruple Scull
 1995 – 13th, Double Scull
 1987 – 11th, Quadruple Scull
 1985 – Silver, Eight

See also
 List of multiple Olympic gold medalists
 Italian men gold medalist at the Olympics and World Championships

References

External links
 
 
 RAI Profile 

1966 births
Living people
People from Pompei
Italian male rowers
Rowers at the 1988 Summer Olympics
Rowers at the 1996 Summer Olympics
Rowers at the 2000 Summer Olympics
Olympic rowers of Italy
Olympic gold medalists for Italy
Olympic medalists in rowing
Rowers of Fiamme Gialle
World Rowing Championships medalists for Italy
Medalists at the 2000 Summer Olympics
Medalists at the 1996 Summer Olympics
Medalists at the 1988 Summer Olympics
Thomas Keller Medal recipients
Sportspeople from the Province of Naples